San Costantino Calabro is a comune (municipality) in the Province of Vibo Valentia in the Italian region Calabria, located about  southwest of Catanzaro and about  southwest of Vibo Valentia.

San Costantino Calabro borders the following municipalities: Francica, Jonadi, Mileto, San Gregorio d'Ippona.

Demographic evolution

Pictures

References

External links

Cities and towns in Calabria